Pochuck Creek is an  tributary of the Wallkill River in Orange County, New York and Sussex County, New Jersey, in the United States.

Pochuck Creek is called Wawayanda Creek (pronounced "way way yonda") above its confluence with the tributary Black Creek.

Wawayanda Creek starts northeast of Warwick, New York, and runs mostly within Orange County, dipping into New Jersey for several miles and joining Black Creek just north of Highland Lakes. Pochuck Creek then turns north and returns to New York.

Tributaries
 Black Creek (New Jersey)

See also
 List of rivers of New Jersey
 List of rivers of New York

References

Tributaries of the Wallkill River
Rivers of New Jersey
Rivers of Sussex County, New Jersey
Rivers of Orange County, New York
Rivers of New York (state)